Sammy White (né Samuel Kwait; 28 May 1894 Providence, Rhode Island – 3 March 1960 Beverly Hills, California) was an American vaudeville song-and-dance comedian who appeared in a few films.  He appeared with Lew Clayton, as Clayton and White, in the Broadway show Schubert Gaieties of 1919.

Career 
With his first wife, Eva Puck, White appeared in vaudeville as Puck and White. They starred in the original Broadway stage version of the classic musical Show Boat (1927). In Show Boat, he played the role of comic dancer Frank Schultz, and Puck played the role of Ellie May Chipley, who eventually marries Frank. In 1932, they reprised their roles in the first Broadway revival of the show. However, by the time the Universal Pictures film version was made in 1936, White and Puck had divorced, so the role of Ellie went to Queenie Smith, with White repeating his performance as Frank in the film.

White later married Broadway actress Beatrice Curtis (1906–1963), the daughter of vaudeville actress Anna Chandler (1884–1957). White repeated his role as Frank in Show Boat yet again in a 1948 New York City Center revival of the show.

He also had a notable supporting role in the Spencer Tracy - Katharine Hepburn film Pat and Mike (1952), as the man to whom Tracy says (when talking about Hepburn), "Not much meat on her, but what there is, is cherce!" White and Puck also appeared in a short film made by Lee De Forest in his Phonofilm sound-on-film process, and premiered at the Rivoli Theater in New York City on 15 April 1923. This film records their comic routine "Opera Vs. Jazz" and is preserved in the Maurice Zouary collection at the Library of Congress.

White played himself in the biopic The Helen Morgan Story (1957), the biography of Helen Morgan, the torch singer who originated the role of Julie LaVerne in the original 1927 Broadway production of Show Boat and also played the role in the 1932 revival and 1936 film.

References

External links

Eva Puck and Sammy White at SilentEra with photo of Puck and White performing their sketch "Opera vs. Jazz"

1894 births
1960 deaths
American male film actors
American male musical theatre actors
American male stage actors
American male television actors
Vaudeville performers
20th-century American male actors
20th-century American singers
20th-century American male singers